The Artificial Lake Castle was built in 1969, when the National Amusement Park was established in the centre of the Mongolian capital Ulaanbaatar. 
It is surrounded by an artificial lake and fortress walls in an eastern-Asian style. Inside the walls is a three-storey building. There are three watch towers. An Ethnographic Museum operated in the castle from its establishment until the mid-2000s. The castle has been rebuilt from 2010 assuming an appearance of a Western castle. The mock castle is part of an amusement complex together with the lake, and dock house.

See also
 Architecture of Mongolia

Tourism in Mongolia
Buildings and structures in Ulaanbaatar
Castles in Mongolia